Lottery! is an American anthologic drama that premiered on ABC on September 9, 1983. The series aired for one season of 17 episodes and starred Ben Murphy as Patrick Sean Flaherty, and Marshall Colt as Eric Rush. Lottery! centered on ordinary people who have won the lottery—all of a sudden becoming millionaires—and how it changes their lives.

Synopsis
Each week, several guest stars become instant millionaires (in two or three different stories) when their lottery tickets bring them fame, fortune, and usually trouble. Flaherty worked for the "Intersweep Lottery." His job was to find the winner(s), inform them of their winnings, and give him or her an envelope containing $5,000 in cash, and a check worth millions. In the event of ownership disputes with the winning ticket, Flaherty would also act as an arbitrator responsible for determining the true recipient in what method used to settle the matter.

Rush was Flaherty's partner, an IRS agent who oversaw the accounting of the payouts and the arrangement of the winner's tax obligations. Each episode also took place in a different city around the country.

The opening titles for the show featured large banks of computers and tape drives. Above what appeared to be a trading floor (similar to what one would see at a stock exchange) were large electronic toteboards showing the latest prizes, the winners's names, and the countries in which they lived. At the end of every episode, the show displayed the following disclaimer:

"The Intersweep Lottery is purely fictitious. Except for states where they are legally authorized, lotteries in this country are illegal."

The Intersweep Lottery itself was actually more akin to the Publishers Clearing House than any of the popular lottery games in the U.S. and around the world, such as the Irish Sweepstakes, which was believed to have given Rosner the idea for the series. Participants in this lottery purchased numbered tickets. Each ticket carried a unique serial number consisting of two letters followed by six numbers. The drawing of winning numbers was also never featured in any of the episodes in this series.

Lottery! is not the first series to deal with the elation and challenges of sudden wealth. The basic premise is loosely similar to an earlier series, The Millionaire with Marvin Miller, except that the money was given out by a mysterious benefactor, John Beresford Tipton, to specific named individuals without the organization of a lottery, and that any taxes on the money had already been paid in advance. In 1979, NBC produced Sweepstakes, an equally short-lived series with a similar premise; it, too, lasted only a single season. In 2006, NBC tried again with Windfall, a series about a group of twenty friends winning a multimillion-dollar lottery prize; that series lasted only three months before cancellation.

US television ratings

Episodes

Awards and nominations

References

External links

1983 American television series debuts
1984 American television series endings
1980s American drama television series
American Broadcasting Company original programming
English-language television shows
Television series by MGM Television
Television shows set in the United States
Works about lotteries
Television shows set in Seattle